Henry Edward Kenny (1 March 1853 – 25 August 1899) was an Australian newspaper proprietor and politician who was a member of the Legislative Assembly of Western Australia from 1897 to 1899, representing the seat of North Murchison.

Kenny was born in North Fremantle, Western Australia, to Bridget (née Reynolds) and John Kenny. He had moved to Geraldton by 1879, working initially as a storekeeper and later as a draper. Kenny later developed interests in mining (on the Murchison goldfields), but came to the attention of the public as the manager of the Geraldton Express, the major newspaper in the region. He eventually became its chief proprietor. Kenny was elected to parliament at the 1897 general election, winning the newly created seat of North Murchison. However, his time in parliament was short-lived, as he died from stomach cancer in August 1899 (aged only 46). He had married a widow, Albina Tregonning (née Nicolay), in 1878, with whom he had two children.

References

1853 births
1899 deaths
Australian newspaper proprietors
Members of the Western Australian Legislative Assembly
People from Fremantle
Western Australian local councillors
19th-century Australian politicians
19th-century Australian businesspeople
People from Geraldton